Eulimacrostoma is a genus of medium-sized sea snails, marine gastropod mollusks in the family Eulimidae.

Distribution

Species
 Eulimacrostoma chascanon (R. B. Watson, 1883)
 Eulimacrostoma fusus (Dall, 1889)
 Eulimacrostoma lutescens (Simone, 2002)
 Eulimacrostoma microsculpturatum Souza & Pimenta, 2019
 Eulimacrostoma patulum (Dall & Simpson, 1901)
Species brought into synonymy
 Eulimacrostoma microsculpturata Souza & Pimenta, 2019: synonym of Eulimacrostoma microsculpturatum Souza & Pimenta, 2019 (wrong gender agreement of specific epithet)

References

External links
 Souza L.S. de & Pimenta A.D. (2019). Eulimacrostoma gen. nov., a new genus of Eulimidae (Gastropoda, Caenogastropoda) with description of a new species and reevaluation of other western Atlantic species. Zoosystematics and Evolution. 95(2): 403-415

 
Eulimidae